Oulu is a town in Bayfield County, Wisconsin, United States. The population was 527 at the 2010 census. The town is named after Oulu, the fifth most populous city of Finland located in the North Ostrobothnia region.

Geography

Demographics
As of the census of 2000, there were 540 people, 192 households, and 134 families residing in the town. According to the 2000 census, 44.7% of the population claimed Finnish as their primary ancestry.

The population density was 15.2 people per square mile (5.9/km2). There were 267 housing units at an average density of 7.5 per square mile (2.9/km2). The racial makeup of the town was 98.52% White, 0.56% Native American, 0.19% Asian, and 0.74% from two or more races. Hispanic or Latino of any race were 0.19% of the population. 44.7% were of Finnish, 16.8% German and 7.5% Irish ancestry.

There were 192 households, out of which 36.5% had children under the age of 18 living with them, 59.4% were married couples living together, 6.8% had a female householder with no husband present, and 29.7% were non-families. 25.5% of all households were made up of individuals, and 9.4% had someone living alone who was 65 years of age or older. The average household size was 2.81 and the average family size was 3.46.

In the town, the population was spread out, with 32.2% under the age of 18, 6.9% from 18 to 24, 27.2% from 25 to 44, 22.8% from 45 to 64, and 10.9% who were 65 years of age or older. The median age was 34 years. For every 100 females, there were 97.8 males. For every 100 females age 18 and over, there were 104.5 males.

The median income for a household in the town was $35,625, and the median income for a family was $45,750. Males had a median income of $32,321 versus $25,938 for females. The per capita income for the town was $15,017. About 7.5% of families and 11.4% of the population were below the poverty line, including 12.0% of those under age 18 and 15.9% of those age 65 or over.

Culture
The Ostrobothnian-based Pudas House in town is the main building of the Oulu Cultural & Heritage Center.

Oulu, Wisconsin is also the name of a single released on 7th January 2022 by Finnish Musician J. Karjalainen.

References

External links
Town of Oulu official website
Oulu Cultural and Heritage Center

Towns in Bayfield County, Wisconsin
Towns in Wisconsin
Finnish-American history
Wisconsin
Finnish-American culture in Wisconsin